Byron Russell (1884 – 1963) was an Irish character actor, best known for is performance as Quintal in the 1935 film Mutiny on the Bounty.

Biography
Born in Ireland in 1884, Russell's first film appearance was in the 1920 American silent film The World and His Wife. He appeared in eleven films prior to the outbreak of World War II, often playing authority figures. After the war, Russell turned his attention to television work, appearing in numerous roles, predominantly in televised plays, between 1949 and 1960.

Russell also appeared on the Broadway stage from 1913 until 1959, notably in the 1929 revival of Eugene O'Neill's Glencairn series of plays.

Russell died in 1963 in New York City.

Filmography

References

1884 births
1963 deaths
People from Clonmel
Irish male silent film actors
Irish male film actors
Irish male stage actors
Irish male television actors
Irish expatriate male actors in the United States
20th-century Irish male actors